

96001–96100 

|-id=086
| 96086 Toscanos || 1006 T-2 || Toscanos, Spain, where the ruins of a Phoenician colony are found || 
|}

96101–96200 

|-id=178
| 96178 Rochambeau ||  || Jean-Baptiste Donatien de Vimeur, comte de Rochambeau (1725–1807), a commander of the French Expeditionary Force supporting the American revolution. French and American troops marched from Newport, Rhode Island to Yorktown, Virginia for the decisive battle, a route now designated as a National Historic Trail. || 
|-id=189
| 96189 Pygmalion ||  || Pygmalion, god of ancient Greek mythology and name of the Greek sculptor who fell in love with his statue, Galatea. The mythical character of Pygmalion has inspired many musicians and writers, notably George Bernard Shaw, and "pygmalionism" is a well-known psychological concept. || 
|-id=192
| 96192 Calgary ||  || Calgary, is the largest city in the province of Alberta, Canada. It was founded in 1875 as a post of the North West Mounted Police and was incorporated as a city in 1894. Calgary's rapid economic growth is due largely to the petroleum industry, agriculture and tourism. || 
|-id=193
| 96193 Edmonton ||  || Edmonton is the capital city of the province of Alberta, Canada. It was founded in 1795 as a trading post and celebrated the centennial of its incorporation as a city in 2004. Edmonton is well-known as a cultural, government and educational center. || 
|-id=200
| 96200 Oschin ||  || Samuel Oschin (1914–2003), an American entrepreneur and philanthropist. The 48-inch Samuel Oschin telescope at Palomar Observatory in California was used to discover this minor planet. || 
|}

96201–96300 

|-id=205
| 96205 Ararat ||  || Mount Ararat, an extinct volcano with double cone-shaped peaks (altitudes 5165 and 3925 m), located in the extreme east of Turkey and near the border to Armenia, Azerbaijan and Iran. It has been sung by poets from ancient times to our days. The name was proposed by Freimut Börngen who co-discovered this minor planet. || 
|-id=206
| 96206 Eschenberg ||  || The Eschenberg Observatory, near Winterthur in Switzerland, was founded in 1979 and attracts 3000 visitors a year. Since 1998 the public observatory has undertaken scientific tasks, especially observations of asteroids. || 
|-id=217
| 96217 Gronchi ||  || Giovanni-Federico Gronchi (born 1970), an Italian astronomer who carries out research at the University of Pisa on celestial mechanics, secular evolution and proper orbital elements of near-Earth asteroids, the mutual geometry of Keplerian orbit determination and collision singularities. || 
|-id=254
| 96254 Hoyo ||  || Hōyo Kaikyō (Hōyo Strait), is a 14-kilometer wide strait between Kyushu and Shikoku, two of the four main islands of Japan. The strait is known as a good fishing ground for chub mackerel and horse mackerel. || 
|-id=263
| 96263 Lorettacavicchi ||  || Loretta Cavicchi (born 1954) an Italian painter and sculptor who studied at the Academy of Fine Arts in Italy (Src). || 
|-id=268
| 96268 Tomcarr ||  || Thomas D. Carr (1917–2011), an American astronomer and contributor to the U.S. efforts in applied science during World War II and a creator of the astronomy program at the University of Florida, is here honored especially for his pioneering work on the radio properties of Jupiter (Src). || 
|}

96301–96400 

|-id=327
| 96327 Ullmann ||  || Liv Ullmann (born 1938), a Norwegian screen actress and movie director who made the groundbreaking picture Persona with Ingmar Bergman. Ullmann will be also remembered for her performance in Höstsonaten (Autumn Sonata, 1978), a film which won the 1979 Golden Globe for Best Foreign Language Film. || 
|-id=344
| 96344 Scottweaver ||  || J. Scott Weaver (1940–2009), was an American professor of geology at Alfred University in New York, where he taught geology, physics and astronomy. He was instrumental in starting the asteroid observation program in 1997 after the 32-inch telescope was computerized. Weaver is a discoverer of minor planets, credited with the co-discovery of the asteroids 31113 Stull and 152641 Fredreed. || 
|-id=348
| 96348 Toshiyukimariko ||  || Toshiyuki Miho (born 1951) and Mariko Miho (born 1956) work as lecturers in an astronomical class room to show the wonders of the night sky to the public. || 
|}

96401–96500 

|-bgcolor=#f2f2f2
| colspan=4 align=center | 
|}

96501–96600 

|-id=506
| 96506 Oberösterreich ||  || Upper Austria (Oberösterreich) is one of the nine federal states of Austria and one of the most important industrial areas of Austria today. Its capital is Linz, where Johannes Kepler lived from 1612 to 1626 and discovered his third law in 1618. Since 1918 the name Oberösterreich has been official. || 
|}

96601–96700 

|-id=612
| 96612 Litipei ||  || Li Tipei (born 1939) is a leading astrophysicist and an Academician of the Chinese Academy of Sciences. He has made significant contributions to the study of highenergy astrophysics, and led Insight-HXMT (Hard X-ray Modulation Telescope), China's first X-ray astronomical satellite. || 
|-id=623
| 96623 Leani ||  || Achille Leani (1924–2004) was an Italian astronomer and one of the founders of the International Union of Amateur Astronomers. Formerly a teacher, he was also a council member of the Società Astronomica Italiana. He founded the Cremona and Soresina observatories, as well as the Gruppo Astrofili Cremonesi. || 
|}

96701–96800 

|-id=747
| 96747 Crespodasilva ||  || Lucy D. Crespo da Silva (1978–2000), Brazilian-American astronomer and the object's discoverer, who died in 2000 at age 22. She was a promising student in planetary sciences at the Massachusetts Institute of Technology. As an observer of light curves of minor planets, she contributed data toward the discovery of spin-vector alignment in the Koronis family. The name was suggested by Richard P. Binzel. This is one of the very rare cases where a minor planet is named after its own discoverer (Src). || 
|-id=765
| 96765 Poznańuni ||  || The Adam Mickiewicz University in Poznań (UAM), Poland, named for the 100-year anniversary of its founding. It is now one of the three top universities in Poland, with about 40 thousand students each year. The teaching and research at UAM includes astronomy, with a strong emphasis on asteroid studies. || 
|}

96801–96900 

|-id=876
| 96876 Andreamanna ||  || Andrea Manna (born 1964) is a Swiss journalist. He is also a guitar player and amateur astronomer. He observes variable stars and occultations by minor planets from his home town of Cugnasco. He also collaborates with the Specola Solare in Locarno. || 
|}

96901–97000 

|-bgcolor=#f2f2f2
| colspan=4 align=center | 
|}

References 

096001-097000